"Crash My Party" is a song written by Rodney Clawson and Ashley Gorley and recorded by American country music artist Luke Bryan. It was released in April 2013 as the first single and title track from Bryan's fourth studio album of the same name.

History
Bryan debuted the song at the Academy of Country Music awards in April 2013, which he hosted with Blake Shelton.

Critical reception
Billy Dukes of Taste of Country gave the single 2.5 stars out of 5, saying that "it's difficult to become excited about a song that's so familiar." Giving it 4 stars out of 5, Matt Bjorke of Roughstock said that "he keeps delivering the kind of song that's helped make him the superstar he rightfully is. Catchy arena-ready choruses, earnest verses and a melody that pulls from other genres".

Music video
The music video was directed by Shaun Silva and premiered on Today on June 20, 2013.

Commercial performance
"Crash My Party" debuted at number 28 on the U.S. Billboard Country Airplay chart for the week of April 27, 2013. It also debuted at number 35 on the U.S. Billboard Hot Country Songs chart for the week of April 20, 2013. It also debuted at number 18 on the U.S. Billboard Hot 100 chart for the week of April 27, 2013. It also debuted at number 18 on the Canadian Hot 100 chart for the week of April 27, 2013.

As of January 2014, the song has sold 1,593,000 copies in the United States.

Charts and certifications

Weekly charts

Year-end charts

Certifications

References

2013 singles
Country ballads
2010s ballads
Luke Bryan songs
Songs written by Rodney Clawson
Songs written by Ashley Gorley
Capitol Records Nashville singles
Music videos directed by Shaun Silva
2013 songs